San Esteban Catarina is a municipality in the San Vicente department of El Salvador.

San Esteban Catarina is set on a hill (cerro) and it has kept the traditional sets of a typical village. Every year in San Esteban Catarina there is a hot air balloon festival.

Sports
The local professional football club is named C.D. Real San Esteban and it currently plays in the Salvadoran Third Division.

Municipalities of the San Vicente Department